Jodi Ewart Shadoff (born 7 January 1988) is an English professional golfer who plays on the LPGA Tour and on the Ladies European Tour.

Early life
Ewart was born at Northallerton in North Yorkshire. Her family now lives in Middleham and is involved in horse racing; her father is a former jockey and horse trainer. As a child, she played football before her grandfather introduced her to golf and to her first coach. She attended the University of New Mexico, graduating with a degree in psychology in 2010. While at New Mexico, she had five collegiate wins and was a two-time NCAA All-American (2009 and 2010).

Amateur career
Ewart was on the Great Britain and Ireland Curtis Cup team in 2008 which was defeated by the United States. She is also a two-time English Women's Strokeplay champion, winning in 2008 and again in 2009.

Professional career
Ewart turned professional in 2010 and played on the Futures Tour. She qualified for the LPGA Tour in 2011. Her most successful season to date is 2013 when she finished tied for 7th in the 2013 Kraft Nabisco Championship and tied for 4th in the 2013 U.S. Women's Open. Her best finish to date is 2nd at the 2017 Women's British Open. She qualified for the Ladies European Tour (LET) in 2012 by winning at the LET Final Qualifying Tournament.

After the conclusion of the 2013 Women's British Open, she was chosen by Liselotte Neumann as one of her four captain's selections to the 2013 European Solheim Cup Team for the matches to be held in Colorado. In 2017, she had the fourth highest total of LET Solheim Cup, qualifying her to compete for the 2017 European Solheim Cup Team held in Des Moines, Iowa.

Unlike many of her fellow competitors she used an anchored putter until anchoring was banned by the R&A.

After 11 seasons on tour, Shadoff won her first LPGA Tour event at the 2022 LPGA Mediheal Championship after 246 starts.

Personal life
Ewart married Adam Shadoff, now a sports anchor and reporter at WOFL-TV in Orlando, Florida, on 19 January 2013.
Shadoff is a diehard supporter of Leeds United F.C.

Professional wins (1)

LPGA Tour wins (1)

Results in LPGA majors
Results not in chronological order before 2018.

^ The Evian Championship was added as a major in 2013

CUT = missed the half-way cut
WD = withdrew
NT = no tournament
"T" = tied

Summary

Most consecutive cuts made – 6 (2015 Evian – 2016 Evian)
Longest streak of top-10s – 1 (five times)

LPGA Tour career summary

^ Official as of 2022 season
^ Includes matchplay and other tournaments without a cut.

World ranking
Position in Women's World Golf Rankings at the end of each calendar year.

Team appearances
Amateur
European Girls' Team Championship (representing England): 2005 (winners)
European Lady Junior's Team Championship (representing England): 2006
European Ladies' Team Championship (representing England): 2007, 2008, 2009
Curtis Cup (representing Great Britain & Ireland): 2008
Espirito Santo Trophy (representing England): 2008
Vagliano Trophy (representing Great Britain & Ireland): 2009

Professional
Solheim Cup (representing Europe): 2013 (winners), 2017, 2019 (winners)
International Crown (representing England): 2016, 2018

Solheim Cup record

References

External links

English female golfers
LPGA Tour golfers
Ladies European Tour golfers
Solheim Cup competitors for Europe
Olympic golfers of Great Britain
Golfers at the 2020 Summer Olympics
New Mexico Lobos women's golfers
Sportspeople from Yorkshire
People from Northallerton
1988 births
Living people